Laznica is a small settlement in the hills north of Cerkno in the traditional Littoral region of Slovenia.

History
Laznica was part of Poče until 1996, when it was separated and made an independent settlement.

References

External links
Laznica on Geopedia

Populated places in the Municipality of Cerkno